'Burton' is a cultivar of hican (nut or tree), a cross between hickory and pecan, species of the genus Carya. The Burton is an edible nut of the hicans; it is considered a shagbark (smaller nuts, higher yielding). Hicans can be both edible or inedible, if the nut is larger, but the tree produces far less than a shagbark they are considered shellbarks. A seedling from 'Burton' is commonly called a 'Dooley Burton' it is also an edible hican nut.  Burton and Dooley Burton nuts have a unique, yet very pleasing hickory flavor indicative of hickory trees. Of the two, Dooley Burton seedlings produce a more noticeable hickory-flavored nut.  Hickory-pecan hybrids are often unproductive.

External links
  Information about the Burton

References

Edible nuts and seeds